Indonesia have participated in the ABU Radio Song Festival six times with eight entries. The Indonesian broadcaster, Radio Republik Indonesia, has been the organiser of the Indonesian entry since the country's debut in the contest in 2012.

History

2012
Radio Republik Indonesia is one of the founder members in the ABU Radio Song Festivals, having participated in the very first ABU Radio Song Festival 2012. At the first festival in Seoul, Korea two songs were submitted to represent Indonesia, these were Rando Sembiring with "Menunggu" and Dorkas Lea Waroy with "Aku Rindu", Rando Sembiring was selected to perform in the final but did not receive a prize.

2014
Indonesia were announced as one of 12 countries participating in the ABU Radio Song Festival 2014 by the ABU, However, for unknown reasons no song was ever placed on the official website and Indonesia did not take part in the event.

2015
On 8 March 2015 Indonesia announced that they would return to the ABU Radio Song Festival, it was also announced that Sisca Christin Dama would be one of the singers in the festival. Indonesia submitted a total of two songs for the festival the first “Selangkah Lebih Dekat” sung by Sisca Christin Dama, and the other"Harmonize of the Soul" by Billy Talahatu. Billy Talahatu was selected to represent Indonesia in Myanmar.

Participation overview 
Table key

See also
Indonesia in the ABU TV Song Festival

References 

Countries at the ABU Song Festival